Cory Lynn Alexander (born June 22, 1973) is an American former professional basketball player who is now an announcer for college basketball and the NBA on ESPN Radio since 2022.
After a career at the University of Virginia (having graduated with a degree in psychology), Alexander was the 29th overall selection in the 1995 NBA draft, chosen by the San Antonio Spurs. He played for the Spurs, the Denver Nuggets, the Orlando Magic and, after a three-year absence from the NBA, the Charlotte Bobcats. His NBA career averages include 5.5 points and 2.7 assists per game. He later became a commentator for the ACC Network (Raycom Sports). Cory is currently working for ESPN as a college basketball commentator. He also runs Cory Alexander Basketball School in Richmond, Virginia.

NBA career statistics

Regular season 

|-
| style="text-align:left;"| 
| style="text-align:left;"|San Antonio
| 60 || 0 || 9.3 || .406 || .394 || .640 || 0.7 || 2.0 || 0.5 || 0.0 || 2.8
|-
| style="text-align:left;"| 
| style="text-align:left;"|San Antonio
| 80 || 6 || 18.2 || .396 || .373 || .736 || 1.5 || 3.2 || 1.0 || 0.2 || 7.2
|-
| style="text-align:left;"| 
| style="text-align:left;"|San Antonio
| 37 || 3 || 13.5 || .414 || .313 || .676 || 1.3 || 1.9 || 0.7 || 0.1 || 4.5
|-
| style="text-align:left;"| 
| style="text-align:left;"|Denver
| 23 || 19 || 34.7 || .435 || .411 || .846 || 4.3 || 6.0 || 2.0 || 0.3 || 14.0
|-
| style="text-align:left;"| 
| style="text-align:left;"|Denver
| 36 || 4 || 21.6 || .373 || .286 || .841 || 2.1 || 3.3 || 1.0 || 0.1 || 7.3
|-
| style="text-align:left;"| 
| style="text-align:left;"|Denver
| 29 || 2 || 11.3 || .286 || .257 || .773 || 1.4 || 2.0 || 0.8 || 0.1 || 2.8
|-
| style="text-align:left;"| 
| style="text-align:left;"|Orlando
| 26 || 0 || 8.7 || .321 || .250 || .667 || 1.0 || 1.4 || 0.6 || 0.0 || 2.0
|-
| style="text-align:left;"| 
| style="text-align:left;"|Charlotte
| 16 || 1 || 12.6 || .327 || .421 || .750 || 1.8 || 2.3 || 0.6 || 0.1 || 3.1
|- class="sortbottom"
| style="text-align:center;" colspan="2"| Career
| 307 || 35 || 15.8 || .389 || .354 || .756 || 1.6 || 2.7 || 0.9 || 0.1 || 5.5

Playoffs 

|-
|style="text-align:left;"|1996
|style="text-align:left;"|San Antonio
| 9 || 0 || 7.8 || .417 || .200 || .714 || 1.0 || 1.0 || 0.2 || 0.0 || 2.9

References

External links
Stats at basketballreference.com

1973 births
Living people
American expatriate basketball people in Italy
American men's basketball players
Basketball players from Virginia
Charlotte Bobcats players
College basketball announcers in the United States
Denver Nuggets players
McDonald's High School All-Americans
Oak Hill Academy (Mouth of Wilson, Virginia) alumni
Orlando Magic players
Pallacanestro Virtus Roma players
Parade High School All-Americans (boys' basketball)
People from Waynesboro, Virginia
Point guards
Roanoke Dazzle players
San Antonio Spurs draft picks
San Antonio Spurs players
Virginia Cavaliers men's basketball players